Sarah of Yemen (fl. 6th century CE) is noted as one of the small number of Arabic-language female poets known for the sixth century CE. It is possible that she was Jewish, in which case she is one of only three attested female medieval Jewish poets (the others being the anonymous, tenth-century wife of Dunash ben Labrat and the probably twelfth-century Qasmuna).

The poem attributed to her survives in the tenth-century anthology named Kitab al-Aghani:

The eulogy implies that Sarah was a member of the Banu Qurayza, commenting on their defeat by Muslims around 627. Little more is known about Sarah, but she 'reputedly participated in a guerrilla action against Muhammad before a Muslim agent killed her.'

References

Arabic-language women poets
Arabic-language poets
Medieval Jewish poets
6th-century women writers
6th-century Arabic poets
Medieval women poets